The Human Chain for Basque Self-determination, also called  (Basque words which mean "our right" and also "the way is in our hands," as a pun), was a human chain and demonstration held on 8 June 2014 in the Basque Country, claiming the Basque people's right to decide about their political status, eventually as a nation. It linked Durango (Biscay) to Iruñea (Navarre) by a human chain along 123 km. About 150,000 persons participated in the human chain, according to the organization's estimates.

Gallery

See also 
 Catalan Way
 Hong Kong Way
 Human Chain for Basque Self-determination, 2018

References

External links 

2014 in the Basque Country (autonomous community)
Basque politics
Human chains (politics)